Prostanthera cruciflora  is a species of flowering plant that is endemic to New South Wales. It is an erect, strongly aromatic shrub with egg-shaped leaves and white flowers with yellow streaks arranged in groups on the ends of branchlets.

Description
Flowering occurs from August to December.

Taxonomy and naming
Prostanthera cruciflora was first formally described in 1967 by James Hamlyn Willis in the journal Muelleria. The specific epithet (cruciflora) is "an allusion to the cross-shaped lower lip of the corolla".

Distribution and habitat
This mint bush grows in heath on exposed rock outcrops in the Mount Kaputar National Park and on nearby ranges.

References

cruciflora
Flora of New South Wales
Lamiales of Australia
Plants described in 1967
Taxa named by James Hamlyn Willis